ADP-sugar pyrophosphatase is an enzyme that in humans is encoded by the NUDT5 gene.

Nudix hydrolases, such as NUDT5, eliminate toxic nucleotide derivatives from the cell and regulate the levels of important signaling nucleotides and their metabolites (McLennan, 1999).[supplied by OMIM]

References

Further reading

Nudix hydrolases